Limnophila aquatica, known commonly as the giant ambulia, is a plant belonging to the family Plantaginaceae. Limnophila aquatica grows naturally in Asia, Sri Lanka and India and is characterised by its fine leaves and bushy, pine-like appearance. It grows best in medium or very high lighting, preferably in acidic soil. It can grow to a height of 25-50 centimetres, and its width can vary from 9-15 centimetres.

References

Plantaginaceae
Flora of Asia